Ditchmore Lane is a cricket ground in Stevenage, Hertfordshire.  The first recorded match on the ground was in 1921, when Hertfordshire played their first Minor Counties Championship match which was against Buckinghamshire.  From 1921 to 2000, the ground played host to 41 Minor Counties Championship matches   and 2 MCCA Knockout Trophy matches.

The ground hosted a single List-A match in the 1969 Gillette Cup between Hertfordshire and Devon.

In local domestic cricket, Digswell Park is the home ground of Stevenage Cricket Club who play in the Home Counties Premier Cricket League Division Two.  The cricket club has existed since 1878 and is the oldest sports club in Stevenage.

References

External links
Ditchmore Lane on CricketArchive
Ditchmore Lane on Cricinfo

Cricket grounds in Hertfordshire
Stevenage
Sports venues completed in 1921